The 2011 Tour de Wallonie was the 38th edition of the Tour de Wallonie cycle race and was held on 23–27 July 2011. The race started in Amay and finished in Thuin. The race was won by Greg Van Avermaet.

General classification

References

Tour de Wallonie
Tour de Wallonie